State Road 80 (NM 80) is  north–south state road in southwestern New Mexico, between the Arizona state line near Rodeo and Interstate 10 (I-10) at Road Forks. Lying entirely within Hidalgo County, New Mexico, it is the only section of the old U.S. Route 80 (US 80) in New Mexico which still retains its number. The route was re-designated NM 80 in 1989. This is the reason why NM 80 has an even number designation despite the highway being north/south. From the south, AZ 80 acts as a continuation of NM 80 into Arizona.

History

In 1903, New Mexico Territorial Road 4 (NM 4) was designated from the Arizona border near Rodeo through Lordsburg and Deming to NM 1 in Las Cruces. Upon creation of New Mexico's first state highway system in 1912, NM 4 was re-designated as New Mexico State Road 4. In Lordsburg, NM 4 passed the western terminus of NM 42, which ran northeast to NM 11 in Silver City. In 1917 the Dixie Overland Highway auto trail was designated between  San Diego, California and Savannah, Georgia over part of NM 4. The Dixie Overland Highway was joined by the Bankhead Highway in 1920 and the Old Spanish Trail in 1923. In 1923, NM 4 was truncated to Lordsburg, and NM 42 extended over its former route to Arizona.

On November 11, 1926, the U.S. Numbered Highway System was established in a joint effort by the United States Department of Agriculture and the American Association of State Highway Officials. NM 42 became part of U.S. Route 80 from Arizona to Lordsburg and U.S. Route 180 from Lordsburg to Silver City. Nationally, US 80 ran from San Diego to Savannah, replacing the earlier auto trails designated along NM 4 and NM 42. US 180 ran from Florence Junction, Arizona to the new U.S. Route 85 northeast of Silver City via Lordsburg. The arrival of the U.S. Highways in New Mexico caused the New Mexico State Highway Department to institute a statewide remembering in 1927 to better include the new routes. As such, NM 42 and the remainder of NM 4 were entirely removed from the state highway system in favor of US 80 and US 180. The route between Arizona and Lordsburg would continue to hold the US 80 designation for the next 63 years. Following the creation of the Interstate Highway System in 1956, Interstate 10 slowly replaced US 80. Starting in 1964, US 80 was truncated eastward in increments from San Diego. in 1989, Arizona and New Mexico requested AASHTO to remove US 80 west of Anthony, New Mexico. The request was approved. The remaining section of US 80 from Benson, Arizona to Roadforks became Arizona State Route 80 and New Mexico State Road 80. The remainder of US 80 was removed from New Mexico in 1991.

Route description

Despite being an even-numbered highway, NM 80 is signed as a north–south route. This is because NM 80 takes its number from the now-defunct US 80, which was an east–west highway, as well as the fact that the highway continues as AZ 80 into Arizona. NM 80 begins at the Arizona state line and eastern terminus of Arizona State Route 80. The highway travels northeast alongside the town of Rodeo. On the north side of the highway is the now abandoned track bed of the former El Paso and Southwestern Railroad. On the northeast end of town at Shady Lane, Rivers Road curves off to the northeast. This is an older section of US 80 that used to lead to a railroad overpass, when the EP&SW was still operational. After the line was abandoned, US 80, now NM 80, was rerouted to a gentle curve bisecting the old track bed. The old overpass has long since been demolished. NM 80 travels straight north from this point on. 8 miles from the Arizona border, NM 80 intersects the eastern terminus of NM 533. Four miles north of NM 533 is the western terminus of NM 9, which heads east to Animas and Columbus. Continuing north, NM 80 passes Rodeo Airport, then curves northeast, skirting the base of both Granite Peak and Blue Mountain. At the eastern base of Blue Mountain is the western terminus of NM 143 NM 80 then makes a straight shot north through a desolate flat desert landscape until it reaches Roadforks. The small unincorporated area has a few service stations and small businesses for both NM 80 and I-10 travelers. NM 80 continues for a few hundred feet north, before ending in a trumpet interchange at I-10 Exit 5. While NM 80 ends here, US 80 would have continued east along much of the current route of I-10 to the Texas border.

Major intersections

See also

 List of state roads in New Mexico

References

Further reading
 Bygone Byways
 US Highway 80 The Broadway of North America
 American Roads U.S. Highway 80

External links

080
Transportation in Hidalgo County, New Mexico
U.S. Route 80